Wang Ao (1384–1467) was a Chinese politician of the Ming dynasty. He was the 1st Viceroy of Liangguang, covering the provinces of Guangdong, Guangxi and Hainan.

External links
明代五朝廉吏王翱

1384 births
1467 deaths
Viceroys of Liangguang